Lux Golden Divas Baatein With Badshah is a 2017 Indian chat show hosted by Shah Rukh Khan. The show was broadcast in 2017 on StarPlus.

Overview 
Lux Golden Divas Baatein is a Hindi talk show that invites celebrities to talk about their personal life and aims to uncover the unseen sides of Bollywood stars. Many celebrities including Kreena Kapoor, Alia Bhatt, Madhuri Dixit, and Deepika Padukone have appeared in the show.

Cast 

 Shahrukh Khan as host

References

External links 
 Lux Golden Divas Baatein With Badshah on YouTube

Indian television series
Indian television talk shows
2017 Indian television series debuts
StarPlus original programming
Indian television shows